Joachim Stadler (born 15 January 1970 in Mosbach) is a German former professional footballer who played as a defender.

Honours
1. FC Kaiserslautern
 DFB-Pokal: 1989–90
 Bundesliga: 1990–91

Borussia Mönchengladbach
 DFB-Pokal: 1994–95

References

External links
 

1970 births
Living people
German footballers
Association football defenders
1. FC Kaiserslautern II players
1. FC Kaiserslautern players
Borussia Mönchengladbach players
SSV Ulm 1846 players
A.P.O. Akratitos Ano Liosia players
Patraikos F.C. players
FC Augsburg players
Bundesliga players
German expatriate footballers
German expatriate sportspeople in Greece
Expatriate footballers in Greece
West German footballers
People from Neckar-Odenwald-Kreis
Sportspeople from Karlsruhe (region)
Footballers from Baden-Württemberg